Gauda may refer to:

 Gauda (caste), or Gopal, a caste of Odisha
 Gauḍa (city), Bengal
 Gauḍa (region), Bengal
 Gauda Kingdom, a kingdom during the 5th to 7th century in Bengal (present-day Gauda city)
 Gauda (king), ruler of Numidia during 1st century BC
 Gauḍa brahmins, part of Pancha-Gauda, India
 Gaudu, Nepal, a village in the Gandaki Zone

See also
 Gaudiya Nritya, a Bengali school of Indian dance
 Gavdos, an island in the Mediterranean Sea
 Gouda (disambiguation)